Anagennisi Larnacas was a Cypriot football club based in Ayios Ioannis of Larnaca. Founded in 1944, was playing sometimes in Second and in Third Division.

References

Defunct football clubs in Cyprus
Football clubs in Larnaca
Association football clubs established in 1944
1944 establishments in Cyprus